Don't Think is a 2012 live album and concert film of The Chemical Brothers when they performed at the Fuji Rock Festival the previous year. The original sound mix is notable for being 7.1 surround sound.

Track listing

DVD
"Tomorrow Never Knows" Intro by Junior Parker, not on CD
"Another World" from Further
"Do It Again" from We Are the Night
"Get Yourself High" from Singles 93–03
"Horse Power" from Further
"Chemical Beats" from Exit Planet Dust
"Swoon" from Further
"Star Guitar" from Come with Us
"Three Little Birdies Down Beats" from Exit Planet Dust
"Hey Boy Hey Girl" from Surrender
"Don't Think" from Further 
"Out of Control" from Surrender
"Setting Sun" from Dig Your Own Hole
"It Doesn't Matter" from Dig Your Own Hole; not on CD
"Saturate" from We Are the Night
"Believe" from Push the Button
"Escape Velocity"/"The Golden Path" from Further/Singles 93–03
"Superflash" 
"Leave Home"/"Galvanize" from Exit Planet Dust/Push the Button
"Block Rockin' Beats"/"Das Spiegel" from Dig Your Own Hole/We Are the Night

CD
"Another World"/"Do It Again"/"Get Yourself High" – 7:22
"Horse Power"/"Chemical Beats" – 9:50
"Swoon"/"Star Guitar" – 10:59
"Three Little Birdies Down Beats"/"Hey Boy Hey Girl" – 5:34
"Don't Think"/"Out of Control"/"Setting Sun" – 10:12
"Saturate" – 7:38
"Believe" – 5:35
"Escape Velocity"/"The Golden Path" – 8:35
"Superflash" – 6:03
"Leave Home"/"Galvanize" – 2:19
"Block Rockin' Beats" – 4:51

References

External links

2012 live albums
The Chemical Brothers albums
Concert films
2010s English-language films